The fourth season of Australian reality television series House Rules, also known as Crowded House Rules, began airing on 27 April 2016. The series is produced by the team who created the Seven reality show My Kitchen Rules and is hosted by Johanna Griggs.

Season 4 of the program was officially announced in 2014 and was originally due to air in late 2015, however the Seven Network delayed the season until 2016 due to an overload of renovation shows that had aired in 2015 as well as lower than expected ratings for the third season.

This season of House Rules will consist of new teams renovating each other's homes and further challenges for the ultimate prize of a full mortgage payment.

Contestant Teams

This season of House Rules introduced six new teams. All teams are from different states in Australia

Elimination history

Competition details

Phase 1: Interior Renovation
The six teams travel around the country to completely renovate each other's home. Every week, one team hands over their house to their opponents for a complete interior transformation. A set of rules from the owners are given to the teams known as the 'House rules' which need to be followed to gain high scores from the judges and the homeowner team.

Victoria: Fil & Joe
 Episodes 1 to 4
 Airdate — 27 April to 1 May 2016
 Description — Fil & Joe from Melbourne, Victoria are the first team to hand over their keys for renovation. Two of the bedrooms belong to their children Jayden, 18 years old and Celeste, 14 years old.

South Australia: Brooke & Michelle
 Episodes 5 to 8
 Airdate — 2 to 8 May 2016
 Description — Teams head to Brooke & Michelle's home in Adelaide, South Australia for the second renovation. One of the bedrooms will be shared for their children Addison, eight years old and Tildie, five years old.
Previous winner's advantage: Luke & Cody — They got to decide on which zone they wanted to renovate
Previous loser's disadvantage: Claire & Hagan — Camping in a tent during the renovation.

New South Wales: Nancy & Daniel
 Episodes 9 to 12
 Airdate — 9 to 15 May 2016
 Description — Teams head to South Sydney, New South Wales to completely renovate Nancy & Daniel's family home. Two of the bedrooms belong to their children; six year old, Jonathan and three year old, Sophia.
Previous winner's advantage: Luke & Cody — Decide to keep the zone they were allocated or swap zones with another team. They decided to keep their zone
Previous loser's disadvantage: Rose & Rob — Camping in a tent during the renovation.

Queensland: Luke & Cody
 Episodes 13 to 16
 Airdate — 16 to 22 May 2016
 Description — Teams head to Dalby, Queensland to renovate Luke & Cody's 1940s home. As their home is more than 200 km away from Brisbane, the teams only have limited time to purchase their items. 
Previous winner's advantage: Rose & Rob — Allocating the zones for themselves and all other teams.
Previous loser's disadvantage: Brooke & Michelle — Camping in a tent during the renovation.

Notes
  As Luke & Cody's birthday landed on the day of their House Reveal, Carolyn asked all the teams to work together to build a new back deck for the boys as a special birthday gift, this was however a non scored zone

Western Australia: Rose & Rob
 Episodes 17 to 20
 Airdate — 23 to 29 May 2016
 Description — Teams head to Rockingham, Western Australia to completely transform Rose & Rob's home. Two of the bedrooms belong to their three children; seven year old, David, six year old, Sam & three year old, Teddy
Previous winner's advantage: Claire & Hagan — They got to decide on which zone they wanted to renovate & five different fabrics with one to be given to each team to incorporate in their room
Previous loser's disadvantage: Fil & Joe — Camping in a tent during the renovation.

Victoria: Claire & Hagan
 Episodes 21 to 24
 Airdate — 30 May to 5 June 2016
 Description — Teams head to Peninsula, Victoria to renovate Claire & Hagan's home for the final interior renovation. In a House Rules first the teams added another level to Claire & Hagan's small house.
Previous winner's advantage: Fil & Joe — Cash bonus of $5000.
Previous loser's disadvantage: Luke & Cody — Although Claire and Hagan were the lowest scoring team in the previous week, they do not participate in the renovation of their own home, therefore the loser's tent was given to the second-lowest scorer.

Phase 2

24 Hour Fix-Up

 Episode 25 & 26
 Airdate — 6 & 7 June 2016
 Description — All teams head back to their own homes and must fix and redo one of the zones in 24 hours. Teams need to recreate the space/s to reflect their own style and also to impress the judges. All teams received the same set of five rules for the challenge. The lowest scoring team will be eliminated.

Phase 3: Gardens & Exteriors

The top 4 teams are challenged to transform the exteriors and gardens of each other's homes. Two teams are allocated to a home (that do not belong to them) and must renovate either the front or back yards, as well as improving the house exterior. They are held over two rounds, covering all houses of the current teams. After both rounds are complete, the lowest scoring team is eliminated.

Round 1

 Episodes 27 & 28
 Airdate —  12 & 13 June
 Description — In round 1 of the exterior renovations, the 4 remaining teams head to Adelaide and Mornington Peninsula to transform the gardens and house exterior in 4 Days. Teams are allocated to the front or back yard of either Brooke & Michelle's or Claire & Hagan's house.

Notes
  As Claire & Hagan's house doesn't have a front yard, the back yard was split into 2, a right side and a left side

Round 2

 Episodes 29 & 30
 Airdate —  14 & 19 June
 Description — In round 2 of the exterior renovations, the 4 remaining teams head to Dalby and Melbourne to transform the gardens and house exterior in 4 Days. Teams are allocated to the front or back yard of either Luke & Cody's or Fil & Joe's house. The lowest scoring team overall is eliminated.

Phase 4

Charity Unit Makeover

 Episodes 31 to 34
 Airdate — 20 to 27 June
 Description — The 3 remaining teams have 7 days to renovate 3 units in an apartment building operated by The Leukaemia Foundation where patients from the country stay during treatment. Each team is given a zone with rooms from all 3 units & a garden area. Each unit has a design brief, Scandi Chic (Unit 1), Balinese Resort (Unit 2) & Manhattan Apartment (Unit 3). The lowest scoring team will be eliminated & the top 2 will advance into the live Grand Final.

Notes
  The room(s) was in Unit 1
  The room(s) was in Unit 2
  The room(s) was in Unit 3

Grand Final

Spa Area and Australia's Vote

 Episode 35
 Airdate — 3 July 2016
 Description — The final 2 teams complete one final challenge at their opponent's home, to create an entertainment spa area. The Australian public vote for their favourite team to win and the winner is decided by a combination of the judges score, for the final project and overall viewer votes. The team with the best result win a complete mortgage payment and is announced live. The secret zones were revealed to be outside entertaining areas that had to incorporate a spa with a pergola to top it off.

Notes
  This result is a combination of 50% from the public vote and 50% from the judge's scores for the Secret Room

Ratings
 Colour key:
  – Highest rating during the season
  – Lowest rating during the season

Ratings data used is from OzTAM and represents the live and same day average viewership from the 5 largest Australian metropolitan centres (Sydney, Melbourne, Brisbane, Perth and Adelaide).

Notes
Melbourne, Adelaide & Perth only
Sydney & Brisbane only

References

2016 Australian television seasons